Novohrodivka is a city in Pokrovsk Raion of Donetsk Oblast (province) of Ukraine. Population: ; 17,473 (2001).

Demographics 
As of the 2001 Ukrainian census:

Ethnicity
 Ukrainians: 61.8%
 Russians: 33.9%
 Belarusians: 1.6%
 Tatars: 0.7%

References

Cities in Donetsk Oblast
Cities of regional significance in Ukraine
Populated places established in the Ukrainian Soviet Socialist Republic
Pokrovsk Raion